Christine "Christy" Haigler (married name: Krall, born January 5, 1948) is an American former competitive figure skater. She is the 1963 and 1965 U.S. silver medalist and 1964 bronze medalist. She represented the United States at the 1964 Winter Olympics, where she placed 7th.

Krall graduated from Cheyenne Mountain High School and Colorado College and trained at the Broadmoor Skating Club. She began coaching part-time at age 18 as an assistant to Carlo Fassi. From 1996 to 2002, Krall served as the senior director of athlete programs for U.S. Figure Skating and was a member of the delegation at the 2002 Winter Olympics in that capacity. She was one of the developers of the USFSA's moves in the field test structure.

Krall coaches in Colorado Springs, Colorado. Her current and former students include Patrick Chan (from mid-December 2009 to April 2012), Agnes Zawadzki (from June 2011 to October 2013), Armin Mahbanoozadeh (from December 2011), Angela Wang, and Joshua Farris.

She began coaching two-time US National Champion Alysa Liu in November 2021.

Competitive highlights

References

External links
Christy Krall a World-Class Act at Ice Skating International

American female single skaters
Olympic figure skaters of the United States
Figure skaters at the 1964 Winter Olympics
American figure skating coaches
Living people
Figure skaters from Colorado Springs, Colorado
1948 births
Female sports coaches
21st-century American women